Cycling in Syracuse, New York, has been common on the roads and paths for recreation, commuting, and as a sport since the latter part of the 19th century.

Syracuse had no fewer than 19 local bicycle manufacturers including Barnes Cycle Company (1895–1899), Central City Bicycle Works (1898), Dodge Cycle Company (1896), E. C. Stearns Bicycle Agency (1893–1899), Emory, Empire Cycle Company (1896–1898), Frazier & Jones Company (1898), Frontenace Manufacturing Company (1896), H. R. Olmsted & Company (1896–1898), J. C. Brown & Company (1904), J. W. Gould (1898), Lighton Machine Company (1895–1896),  Olive Wheel Company (1897–1901), Ruben Woods, Syracuse Cycle Company (1894–1898), Syracuse Specialty Manufacturing Company (1896), makers of the Frontenac, Tourist Bicycle Company (1896–1898), Wooden Hickory Frame Cycle Works (1893–1898) and Worden Frame Hickory Bicycle Works.

Syracuse racers 
Most raced for local bicycle manufacturers nationally and even worldwide. A few were native Syracusans;

 E. E. Anderson - Professional racer from St. Louis, Missouri, of "mile a minute fame," rode a Stearns bicycle during the 1897 season.
 Eddie Bald (1874–1946) - Professional racer rode the Cannon Ball and carried the name of Syracuse-made machines into the national cycling field.
 Carroll B. Jack - Raced for Stearns in 1896.
 John S. Johnson (1873–1934) - Rode a Stearns wheel when he made a "remarkable mile" in 1:35 in 1895.
 Earl Kiser (1875–1936) - Member of team of Round-the-World Yellow Fellows in 1896. He was nicknamed the "Little Dayton Demon".
 William Martin - Member of team of Round-the-World Yellow Fellows in 1896.
 John J. McLaughlin - Raced on a Stearns Yellow Fellow and broke the record on December 18, 1894.
 C. M. Murphy - Professional bicyclist and winner of the Madison Square Garden races. Later hired by E. C. Stearns & Company in 1896 to ride the Stearns bicycle in Paris, France.
 Major Taylor (1878–1932) - Raced for E. C. Stearns Bicycle Agency in 1899.
 William Van Wagoner (1870-) - Competitive bicycle racer in the Northeast from 1888 to mid-1890s. Went on to design Barnes bicycles and later automobiles.
 Harry Wheeler - Member of team of Round-the-World Yellow Fellows in 1896.
 John Wilkinson (1868–1951) - By 1880, he was one of the country's leading bicycle racers and later worked for Syracuse Cycle Company where he designed the Crimson Rim. By his mid 20s he went on to design the Franklin automobile air-cooled engine.
 Frank W. Knowland (1877-1952) - In 1895 he held the one-mile and 10-mile road championships of New York State.  He began work for the Syracuse Cycle Co. in the winter of 1895-96 and later switched to William Spaulding & Co., where he built up the sporting goods department.  He bought an interest in Doubleday & Co., changing the name to Doubleday-Knowland Co., after having spent several years with the A. G. Spalding store and the Wright Ditson Co.

See also 
 History of cycling
 History of sports in Syracuse, New York

References

External links 
 1895 Stearns
 1896 Stearns "Yellow Fellow"
 White flyer advertisement, Los Angeles Herald, April 1, 1900

Cycling
Syracuse, New York
Cycling